Episcopal Diocese of Milwaukee, originally the Diocese of Wisconsin is the diocese of the Episcopal Church in the United States of America located in the southern area of Wisconsin. It is in Province V (for the Midwest region).  The Rt. Reverend Steven Miller was the most recent bishop, serving until December 31, 2020. Jeffrey D. Lee serves as bishop provisional

Cathedral
The see city is Milwaukee. Cathedral Church of All Saints, Milwaukee is the mother church.

History
The diocese was formed after Jackson Kemper was named the Episcopal Church's first missionary bishop and oversaw the church's mission to the Northwest Territories from 1835 to 1859. He became provisional bishop of Wisconsin from 1847 to 1854 and first bishop of the Diocese of Wisconsin from 1854 to 1870.

In 1875, the Diocese of Fond du Lac was created to serve the northeastern 26 counties of the state. The Diocese of Eau Claire, was carved out of the diocese in 1928 for the counties in the northwestern part of Wisconsin. The Diocese of Wisconsin became the Diocese of Milwaukee in 1886.

During the first two decades of the 21st-century or so membership declined from 15,000 to 8,000.

In 2021 it was announced that the diocese of Fond du Lac, Eau Claire, and Milwaukee would contemplate entering an agreement of greater collaboration. In October 2021 it was announced that the three diocese would be actively pursuing reuniting as one diocese in Wisconsin.

Bishops
 Jackson Kemper (1859-1870)
 William Edmond Armitage (1870-1873)
 Edward Randolph Welles (1874-1888)
 Cyrus Frederick Knight (1889-1891)
 Isaac Lea Nicholson (1891-1906)
 William Walter Webb (1906-1933)
 Benjamin Franklin Price Ivins (1933-1952)
 Donald Hathaway Valentine Hallock (1953-1973)
 Charles Thomas Gaskell (1974-1985)
 Roger J. White (1985-2003)
 Steven Andrew Miller (2003-2020)
Jeffrey D. Lee, bishop provisional (2021–present)

Education
Nashotah House, in Nashotah, which is a seminary for the Episcopal Church, and St. John's Northwestern Military Academy in Delafield, Wisconsin, a private Episcopal military academy, are also located in the Diocese of Milwaukee.

Cadle Mission and Racine College were also located in the diocese.

Parishes in the diocese
St. James Episcopal Church, Milwaukee is listed on the National Register of Historic Places.
St. Matthew's Episcopal Church, Kenosha is listed on the National Register of Historic Places.
St. Paul's Episcopal Church, Milwaukee is listed on the National Register of Historic Places.

Notes

External links
The Episcopal Diocese of Milwaukee
Journal of the Annual Council of the Protestant Episcopal Church in the Diocese of Wisconsin
Journal of the Annual Council of the Protestant Episcopal Church in the Diocese of Milwaukee

Milwaukee
Episcopal Church in Wisconsin
Christianity in Milwaukee
 
Religious organizations established in 1854
Anglican dioceses established in the 19th century
1854 establishments in Wisconsin
Province 5 of the Episcopal Church (United States)